The 1969 World Sportscar Championship season was the 17th season of FIA World Sportscar Championship motor racing. It featured the 1969 International Championship for Makes, which was a series for FIA Group 6 Prototype Sports Cars, Group 4 Sports Cars and Group 3 Grand Touring Cars and the 1969 International Cup for GT Cars, which was restricted to Group 3 Grand Touring Cars. The season ran from 1 February 1969 to 10 August 1969 and comprised 10 races.

Porsche won both the International Championship for Makes and the International Cup for GT Cars.

Schedule

† - Sportscars & Sports Prototypes only, GT category did not participate.

Race results

Points system
Points were awarded to the top six finishers in each race on a 9-6-4-3-2-1 basis. Manufacturers were only given points for their highest finishing car in each race with no points awarded for positions gained by any other cars from that manufacturer.

Sports, Sports Prototype and GT cars were eligible to score points for their manufacturer in the overall championship and the GT category also had its own separate award.

Cars that were not included in the Sports, Sports Prototype or GT categories in a race were not eligible to score points for the overall championship.

Only the best five points finishes counted towards a manufacturer's total, with any other points earned being discarded. Discarded points are shown within brackets in the tables below.

Championship Standings

International Championship for Makes

International Cup for GT Cars
The GT class did not participate in Round 3.

The cars
The following models  contributed to the nett points totals of their respective manufacturers:

International Championship for Makes
 Porsche 908/2 & 908L
 Ford GT40              
 Lola T70 Mk.3B & T70 Mk.3 Chevrolet
 Ferrari 312P 
 Matra MS650              
 Chevron B8 BMW             
 Alfa Romeo T33/2 
 Alpine-Renault A220

International Cup for GT Cars
 Porsche 911T 
 Chevrolet Corvette & Camaro
 Ferrrari 275GTB/C
 Lancia Fulvia HF Zagato
 MGB

References

External links
 World Sportscar Championship at www.classicscars.com 
 World Sportscar Championship at www.racingsportscars.com

World Sportscar Championship seasons
World Sportscar Championship